Gordon is an unincorporated community in Manitoba, Canada, within the Rural Municipality of Rosser. It is named for James Gordon, who was in charge of leases in the General Manager's Office of the Canadian National Railway.

History 
The railway point on the CNR Oak Point subdivision, operated by the Canadian National Railway, was established in 1905. In 1928, a grain elevator was built by Manitoba Pool Elevators. It was closed in 1988 and demolished the next year. A post office was opened in 1929, but it was closed in 1952.

References 

Unincorporated communities in Manitoba